Jiří Novotný (born August 12, 1983) is a Czech professional ice hockey centre who currently plays for Motor České Budějovice of the Czech Extraliga (ELH).

Playing career
Novotný was drafted 22nd overall by the Buffalo Sabres in the 2001 NHL Entry Draft. He spent two seasons with HC České Budějovice in the Czech Republic before moving on to the Sabres' American Hockey League (AHL) affiliate, the Rochester Americans. He made his NHL debut with the Sabres in a January 12, 2006 game against the Phoenix Coyotes.

Novotný's first NHL point came in his second game, when he assisted on a Daniel Paille goal against the Los Angeles Kings on January 14, 2006. His first NHL goal came in his sixth game, against the Florida Panthers on February 11, 2006.

He was traded on February 27, 2007 to the Washington Capitals with a 1st round pick in the 2007 NHL Entry Draft for Dainius Zubrus and Timo Helbling. At the conclusion of the season, he was not extended a qualifying offer by the Capitals, making him an unrestricted free agent.

On July 3, 2007, Novotný was signed by the Columbus Blue Jackets to a two-year contract.

On July 2, 2014, he signed a two-year contract with Lokomotiv Yaroslavl, after Lev Praha announced not to participate in 2014–15 KHL season.

Having returned to the Czech Republic to begin the 2018–19 season with HC Plzeň of the ELH, on September 20, 2018, one day prior to the start of the National League, Novotny was signed to a two-month contract worth CHF 500,000 by HC Ambrì-Piotta to replace injured Bryan Lerg. Novotny will make CHF 84,000 out of this contract. On October 25, 2018, his CHF 500,000 contract was extended through the end of the 2018–19 season.

Career statistics

Regular season and playoffs

International

References

External links

1983 births
Living people
HC Ambrì-Piotta players
Atlant Moscow Oblast players
Barys Nur-Sultan players
Buffalo Sabres draft picks
Buffalo Sabres players
Columbus Blue Jackets players
Czech ice hockey centres
Czech expatriate ice hockey players in Russia
HC Lada Togliatti players
HC Lev Praha players
KLH Vajgar Jindřichův Hradec players
Lokomotiv Yaroslavl players
Ice hockey players at the 2014 Winter Olympics
Motor České Budějovice players
National Hockey League first-round draft picks
Olympic ice hockey players of the Czech Republic
People from Pelhřimov
HC Plzeň players
Rochester Americans players
Traktor Chelyabinsk players
Washington Capitals players
Sportspeople from the Vysočina Region
Czech expatriate ice hockey players in the United States
Czech expatriate sportspeople in Kazakhstan
Expatriate ice hockey players in Kazakhstan
Czech expatriate ice hockey players in Switzerland